The 1913 Kansas State Aggies football team represented Kansas State Agricultural College—now known as Kansas State University—as a member of the Kansas Collegiate Athletic Conference (KCAC) and the Missouri Valley Conference (MVC) during the 1913 college football season. Led by third-year head coach Guy Lowman, the Aggies compiled an overall record of 3–4–1 with a mark of 2–1–1 in KCAC play, placing fourth in the KCAC. Kansas State was 0–2 against MVC opponents, placing sixth in that conference.

Schedule

References

Kansas State
Kansas State Wildcats football seasons
Kansas State Aggies football